James Henry Cookson (28 January 1869 – 27 May 1922), better known as Harry "Gyp" Cookson, was an English professional footballer. A forward, he played for South Shore, Burslem Port Vale, Blackpool, and Accrington.

Career
Cookson began his career with South Shore (a club that would merge with Blackpool F.C. in 1900), making his debut on 11 September 1886, before joining Burslem Port Vale in late August 1887, along with his teammate Richard Elston. Cookson scored 23 goals in 33 friendlies to become the club's top-scorer in the 1887–88 season. Both Cookson and Elston returned to South Shore in the summer of 1888, and were members of the team that beat Fleetwood Rangers 6–1 to win the Fylde Cup in 1888.

He fell out with South Shore at the end of the 1889–90 season, and signed with non-League Blackpool on 2 April. He made his debut for the "Seasiders" at the start of the following 1890–91 campaign, in a 5–1 defeat at Heywood Central on 6 September. By December, he had been re-signed for another season for fifteen shillings a week.

In May 1892, he joined Accrington (in part-exchange for full-back Jerry Morgan) for £40. His first official game was against the club he had just left, on 1 September; Blackpool won 4–2. He went on to make a further 26 league appearances, scoring fourteen goals. He played in the test match defeat to Sheffield United at Trent Bridge that saw Accrington relegated out of the First Division. This was his final appearance for the club.

In May 1893, he returned to Blackpool. His first comeback game for the club was against Accrington, a 3–1 victory on 2 September. He scored over twenty goals during the 1893–94 season. He played his final game for Blackpool on 25 April 1896, in a 3–1 defeat to Darwen.

Personal and later life
Outside of football, Cookson was a builder and contractor. His father, Thomas, had built, amongst other things, the Clifton Arms Hotel.

Cookson married Polly Castle at South Shore's Holy Trinity Church on 28 January 1895 and honeymooned later the same day in London.

Cookson died on 27 May 1922, aged 53. He was survived by his widow, two sons and two daughters. He was buried at Layton cemetery. After his death, his widow became vice-chairman of South Shore, and one of his sons played for the club.

Career statistics
Source:

References

1869 births
1922 deaths
Sportspeople from Blackpool
English footballers
Association football forwards
South Shore F.C. players
Port Vale F.C. players
Blackpool F.C. players
Accrington F.C. players
English Football League players